"Designer" is a Hindi language song and is sung by Guru Randhawa and Yo Yo Honey Singh, produced by Bhushan Kumar and written by Guru Randhawa and Yo Yo Honey Singh. 

The single features Divya Khosla Kumar, and the record was released on May 19, 2022. Upon release, the song topped on YouTube trending charts.

References 

2022 songs